Penstemon tubaeflorus, common name  white wand beardtongue, is a species of Penstemon found in the United States and the lower parts of Canada.

References

Flora of North America
tubaeflorus